Fawzi El-Mulki (1910–1962) was a Jordanian diplomat and politician. While serving as ambassador to the United Kingdom in the early 1950s, he befriended King Hussein, who was studying there. 

In 1953 Hussein appointed al-Mulki to be the 10th Prime Minister of Jordan. He was dismissed in 1954 after his liberal policies caused riots throughout the country.

Career 
In 1934 he was employed at the Education Department (now ministry of Education).
From 1940 to 1947 he was Deputy Food controller, later Economic Adviser to the Government.
In 1947 he was successively Consul-General in Cairo and Jordan Minister to Egypt and Minister of Foreign Affairs of Jordan.
During the 1948 Palestine war he was Minister of Defense in the cabinet of Tawfik Abu al-Huda (28 December 1947 - 12 April 1950).
In 1951 he was Minister in Paris (France).
From November 1951 to 1953 he was Minister/ambassador in London (Great Britain) while Hussein of Jordan was educated.
From 5 May 1953 to 2 May 1954 he was Prime Minister of Jordan.
In a cabinet of 1956 he was Minister of Foreign Affairs and Education.

External links
 Prime Ministry of Jordan website

References 

1910 births
1962 deaths
People from Irbid
Prime Ministers of Jordan
Government ministers of Jordan
Foreign ministers of Jordan
Transport ministers of Jordan
Defence ministers of Jordan
Education ministers of Jordan
Deputy prime ministers of Jordan
Public works ministers of Jordan
Jordanian military personnel
Ambassadors of Jordan to Egypt
Permanent Representatives of Jordan to the United Nations
Ambassadors of Jordan to France
Ambassadors of Jordan to the United Kingdom
Alumni of the University of Edinburgh